Colposphodrus mirandus is a species of beetle in the family Carabidae, the only species in the genus Colposphodrus.

References

Platyninae